Stade Denis Sassou Nguesso is a multi-use stadium in Dolisie, Republic of the Congo.  It is used for football matches and serves as the home of AC Léopard of the Congo Premier League. It holds 5,000 spectators.

References

Football venues in the Republic of the Congo